Jealousy is a 1931 British drama film directed by G.B. Samuelson and starring Lilian Oldland, Malcolm Keen, Harold French and Frank Pettingell. It was shot at Isleworth Studios as a quota quickie for distribution by Warner Brothers.

Synopsis
The film follows a man who falls madly in love with a woman and stages a robbery in an effort to frame her sweetheart.

Cast
 Lilian Oldland as Joyce Newcombe (credited as Mary Newland)
 Malcolm Keen as Henry Garwood 
 Harold French as Bernard Wingate 
 Gibb McLaughlin as Littleton Pardmore 
 Sam Livesey as Inspector Thompson 
 Henrietta Watson as Mrs. Delahunt 
 Henry Carlisle as Clayton 
 Frank Pettingell as Professor Macguire

References

Bibliography
 Chibnall, Steve. Quota Quickies: The Birth of the British 'B' Film. British Film Institute, 2007.
 Low, Rachael. Filmmaking in 1930s Britain. George Allen & Unwin, 1985.
 Wood, Linda. British Films, 1927-1939. British Film Institute, 1986.

1931 films
1931 drama films
British drama films
1930s English-language films
British black-and-white films
1930s British films
Films shot at Isleworth Studios
Quota quickies
British films based on plays
Warner Bros. films
English-language drama films